Charles Doughty may refer to:

Charles Montagu Doughty (1843–1926), English poet and traveller
Charles Doughty (lawyer) (1878–1956), British barrister
Charles Doughty (politician) (1902–1973), British Member of Parliament and barrister; son of the above
Charles Doughty-Wylie (1868–1915), English recipient of the Victoria Cross

See also
Charles Dougherty (disambiguation)